Yuka Onishi or Ohnishi (大西結花, Ōnishi Yuka, born July 6, 1968 in Toyonaka-shi, Osaka préfecture, Japan) is a Japanese actress and idol singer in the 1980s, notable in the west for her role in the TV series Sukeban Deka III in 1987 and its following movies, Sukeban Deka: The Movie and Sukeban Deka II.

Discography

Albums 

 1986.07.01 : Abunai Tightrope
 1987.08.31 : Take a Chance - Summer Bright
 1988.03.25 : Le reve
 1988.11.25 : Peppermint Mocha
 1989.05.25 : Bridge
 1989.10.25 : Resistance
 1991.07.25 : One Way Call
 2002.07.30 : Reshipi ("recipe", mini-album)

Compilations

 1987.03.25 : Shadow Hunter - Yuka Collection
 1987.04.25 : Shadow Hunter - Yuka File #1 (with new songs)
 1987.12.21 : Greetings From the Big West - Yuka File #2 (mini-album with new songs)
 1988.07.01 : Memory - Onishi Yuka Best
 1988.10.25 : Summer Concert '88 Le reve de l'ete (live)
 1989.06.25 : Best of Best
 2004.12.22 : Golden Best

Singles 

 1985.02.25 : Arabesque Romanesque
 1985.07.25 : Hankoki
 1985.12.10 : Yasashikute Kanashikute
 1986.05.25 : Abunai Tightrope
 1987.02.25 : Shadow Hunter
 1987.06.25 : Chance wa Ichido dake
 1987.09.23 : Kanashimi no Shangrila
 1988.02.10 : Mimosa no Kiseki
 1988.06.08 : Nagisa Toori no Discotech
 1988.10.25 : Tulip no Tsubomi
 1989.04.25 : Suki ni shite...
 1989.09.25 : Midnight TV
 1991.07.25 : Gozen Niji no SA-YO-NA-RA
 1993.01.21 : Hoshizora no Shita de
 1998.06.20 : Fly Away

Filmography 
Typhoon Club (1985)

(to add)

References

External links 

  Official site
  Official blog
   Official entry, filmography and discography on her agency site
  Entry on Idollica.com
  Fansite with details on all her productions
 

Japanese idols
Japanese actresses
Living people
1968 births
People from Toyonaka, Osaka
Musicians from Osaka Prefecture